Fahrenheit 88 is a shopping centre in Bukit Bintang, Kuala Lumpur, Malaysia. The Fahrenheit 88 building (previously known as KL Plaza) reopened in August 2010 after extensive renovation. Management and leasing of the shopping centre are handled by the same company that manages the Pavilion Kuala Lumpur shopping centre.

History 

The Fahrenheit 88 building was previously known as KL Plaza (shopping centre) and owned by the Berjaya Group. In 2007, Berjaya Group disposed of the KL Plaza building for a total consideration of RM470 million to the Pavilion Group. The sale consisted of the 5-storey shopping podium for RM425 million and 59 units of flats located on top of the shopping centre for RM45 million.

In early 2010, a publicity exercise was embarked by the Pavilion team, with major local press reporting on the rebranding of the building as Fahrenheit 88, a name reflecting the average temperature in Malaysia (31.1 C). Building renovation works, already underway at that time and reportedly to cost RM100 million, were intended to entirely change the interior and exterior of the old and outdated building, with entrances  repositioned and glass facades added, allowing ample natural light to illuminate the interior.

Accessibility
This shopping centre is accessible by several railway lines that run through the city centre. 
	
 KL Monorail, Fahrenheit 88 is located close to the Bukit Bintang Monorail station or Raja Chulan Monorail station.
 Kajang line, the MRT station is located in front of its next-door neighbour Lot 10 via PAVILION-Bukit Bintang station.

See also
 List of shopping malls in Malaysia

References

2010 establishments in Malaysia
Shopping malls in Kuala Lumpur